Kori Markese Dickerson (born December 6, 1978) is a former  American football tight end in the National Football League and Canadian Football League.

Pre-professional career
Dickerson prepped at Washington Preparatory High School, and he played college football at the University of Southern California.

Professional career
Previously, he played with the NFL Europe Hamburg Sea Devils and the National Football League Detroit Lions and Philadelphia Eagles.

External links
TSN Profile

1978 births
Living people
USC Trojans football players
American football tight ends
Philadelphia Eagles players
Players of American football from Los Angeles
Frankfurt Galaxy players
Calgary Stampeders players
Hamburg Sea Devils players
Players of Canadian football from Los Angeles